Christopher Robert Higgins (born June 2, 1983) is an American former professional ice hockey winger and current Skills and Development coach for the Vancouver Canucks of the National Hockey League (NHL). While playing college hockey, he was selected 14th overall by the Montreal Canadiens in the first round of the 2002 NHL Entry Draft. He finished a two-year career with the Yale Bulldogs, earning ECAC Hockey Player of the Year honors as a sophomore, before turning professional for the 2003–04 season. After two seasons with the Canadiens' minor league affiliate, the Hamilton Bulldogs of the American Hockey League (AHL), he joined the NHL in 2005–06. He recorded three consecutive 20-goal seasons to begin his NHL career before being traded to the New York Rangers in June 2009. After brief stints with the Rangers, Calgary Flames and Florida Panthers, he joined the Vancouver Canucks in February 2011. Internationally, Higgins has competed for the United States in two World Junior Championships (2002 and 2003) and one World Championship (2009).

Playing career

Amateur career (1998–2003)
Higgins played four years of high school hockey for Avon Old Farms, a preparatory school in Avon, Connecticut, graduating in 2001. He then opted to play in the National Collegiate Athletics Association (NCAA) with the Yale Bulldogs. Higgins also considered offers from Boston College and Harvard University. In 2001–02, Higgins began a two-year stint with the Yale Bulldogs of the ECAC Hockey Conference. After recording a team-leading 31 points (14 goals and 17 assists) over 27 games as a freshman, he was named the ECAC Rookie of the Year. He additionally received ECAC All-Rookie and Second All-Star Team honors.

In the off-season, Higgins was selected 14th overall by the Montreal Canadiens in the 2002 NHL Entry Draft. He became the first ECAC Hockey player to be selected in the first round of the NHL Entry Draft since Normand Lacombe in 1983 (the Buffalo Sabres selected him 10th overall). Returning to Yale for one more season, he improved to 41 points over 28 games, leading his team in scoring for the second consecutive year. Higgins earned ECAC Player of the Year (co-recipient with Cornell Big Red goaltender David LeNeveu) and First All-Star Team honors; he was also recognized regionally on the NCAA East All-American Team.

Montreal Canadiens (2003–2009)
Following his sophomore year, he signed a three-year, entry-level contract with the Canadiens on May 22, 2003. Higgins made his NHL debut on October 11, 2003, registering three minutes of ice time in a 4–0 win against the Toronto Maple Leafs. Struggling to play his way onto the Canadiens' lineup, he was often made a healthy scratch (non-dressing player) in October before being assigned to the team's minor league affiliate, the Hamilton Bulldogs of the American Hockey League (AHL), by the end of the month. He recorded 48 points over 67 AHL games in 2003–04, ranking fifth in team scoring. Due to the 2004–05 NHL lockout, Higgins automatically remained in Hamilton and improved to 51 points, ranking third among Bulldogs scorers.

The following season, as NHL play resumed, Higgins made the Canadiens' roster out of training camp. He scored his first career NHL goal on October 6, 2005, against New York Rangers goalie Kevin Weekes during an away game at Madison Square Garden. The Canadiens won the contest 4–3 in overtime. He finished the season with 23 goals, ranking seventh among league rookies, and 15 assists for a total of 38 points.

A month into the 2006–07 season, Higgins suffered a sprained left ankle during a game against the New Jersey Devils. At the time of the injury, on November 4, 2006, he was leading the Canadiens with eight goals. Sidelined for 6 weeks, Higgins was limited to 61 games, though still managed to match his previous season's points total with 22 goals and 16 assists. Set to become a restricted free agent in the off-season, Montreal re-signed Higgins to a two-year, US$3.4 million deal on June 25, 2007. Prior to the start of the 2007–08 season, Higgins was named an alternate captain for the Canadiens. He went on to have a career season with personal bests of 27 goals, 25 assists and 52 points. On November 11, 2008, Higgins recorded his first NHL hat-trick in a 4–0 win over the Ottawa Senators. However, his points total decreased in his fourth NHL campaign with 23 points over 57 games.

Rangers, Flames and Panthers (2009–2011)

Coming off what was the lowest statistical season of his career, he was traded by the Canadiens, along with Ryan McDonagh, Pavel Valentenko and Doug Janik, to the New York Rangers in exchange for Scott Gomez, Tom Pyatt and Michael Busto on June 30, 2009. A restricted free agent at the time of the trade, he agreed to a one-year, US$2.25 contract with the Rangers six days later. He scored his first goal with the Rangers on November 3, 2009, against the Vancouver Canucks, his team's lone marker in a 4–1 loss. His offensive struggles continued in New York (he recorded 15 points in 55 games) and he was subsequently traded to the Calgary Flames on February 2, 2010. Higgins was dealt, along with Aleš Kotalík, in exchange for Olli Jokinen and Brandon Prust. He scored his first goal with the Flames on March 9, an empty netter, in a 4–1 win against the Detroit Red Wings. Two days later, he suffered a foot injury that sidelined him for the remaining 14 games of the regular season. Splitting the season between New York and Calgary, he had eight goals and 17 points over 67 games.

Becoming an unrestricted free agent in the off-season, Higgins signed a one-year, US$1.6 million deal with the Florida Panthers on July 2, 2010. He had considered re-signing with Calgary, but cited new Florida Panthers General Manager Dale Tallon's experience as a strong factor for joining Florida (Tallon was largely responsible for assembling the Chicago Blackhawks team that won the Stanley Cup the previous season). In December 2010, he was sidelined four games with a Staphylococcal infection in his foot, an injury that was misdiagnosed first as "skate bite," then a spider bite. Higgins later missed an additional seven games the following month with a hamstring injury.

Vancouver Canucks (2011–2016)
With the Panthers out of playoff contention late in the season, the team began trading away numerous veterans and core players. At the NHL trade deadline, on February 28, 2011, Higgins was dealt to the Vancouver Canucks in exchange for defensive prospect Evan Oberg and a third-round draft pick in 2013. The Canucks had reportedly been interested in a different Panthers player, but with a minute left until the trade deadline, Panthers Assistant General Manager Mike Santos called the Canucks back and offered Higgins. In 48 games with the Panthers, he had recorded 11 goals and 23 points. Injured with a hand injury at the time of the trade, he did not debut with the Canucks until March 10. He scored his first two goals as a Canuck on March 27 in a 4–1 win against the Columbus Blue Jackets. He completed the season with 13 goals and 28 points in 62 games between Florida and Vancouver. While Higgins played the majority of the regular season with the Canucks as a bottom-six forward, by the playoffs, he was playing on the second line centered by Ryan Kesler. Entering the post-season as the Presidents' Trophy champions, the Canucks held the first seed in the West. After eliminating the Chicago Blackhawks, Nashville Predators and San Jose Sharks in the first three rounds, the Canucks advanced to the Stanley Cup Finals. Facing the Boston Bruins, the series went to a seventh game, which the Canucks lost 4–0. Following the Canucks' defeat, it was revealed that several Canucks players had been playing with injuries, including Higgins. His injury occurred in the second round against the Predators, when he blocked a shot with his skate, breaking his foot. Over 25 playoff games, Higgins recorded four goals and eight points. Three of his goals were game-winners, tying him with Geoff Courtnall (1994) for the most in a single playoff season by a Canucks player.

During the off-season, Higgins re-signed with Vancouver to a two-year, $3.8 million contract on July 1, 2011. The deal was agreed upon prior to his scheduled unrestricted free agency. During the season, Higgins struggled with two bouts of Staph infection, one in December 2011 and the other in February 2012. He missed a combined 11 games as a result of swelling and suffering from severe side effects to the associated medication. Though he missed time, Higgins also played through the adverse reactions for several games following both bouts with the infection. Through the first half of the season, he often played on the second line with Kesler and David Booth; the trio were dubbed the "American Express Line," as they were all born in the United States. Towards the end of the season, he was consistently placed on the team's third line, a defensive shutdown unit with fellow two-way forwards Jannik Hansen and deadline-acquisition Samuel Påhlsson. Used in both roles over the campaign, Higgins was often recognized as the team's most consistent and hardest-working forward. On the last day of the regular season, he was accordingly awarded the Fred J. Hume Award, voted by fans as the team's "unsung hero." Appearing in 71 games, Higgins recorded 43 points (18 goals and 25 assists), his highest total in four years and fifth among team forwards.
On April 2, 2013, Higgins signed a four-year, $10 million extension with the Canucks.

During the 2015–16 season, on January 12, 2016, Higgins was put on waivers after unsuccessful attempts to trade the winger. He cleared waivers the next day and was sent down to the Utica Comets, the AHL affiliate of the Canucks. On March 19, 2016, Higgins was recalled by the Vancouver Canucks after multiple injuries occurred on both the Canucks and Comets rosters. He would finish the season with the Canucks.

In the off-season, on June 27, 2016, Higgins's tenure in Vancouver ended when he was placed on waivers by the Canucks for the intention of buying out the remaining year of his contract. On August 30, 2016, unable to secure an NHL contract, Higgins signed a PTO to attend training camp with former club, the Calgary Flames. On October 10, Higgins was released from his tryout.

International play
Higgins played in back-to-back World Junior Championships during his college career. First appearing in 2002, he recorded four goals and two assists over seven games. He helped the United States qualify for the quarterfinal, where they were eliminated by Russia 6–1. The following year, Higgins matched his points total with three goals and three assists. After losing their semifinal to Canada 3–2, the United States lost by the same score to Finland in the bronze medal game.

Higgins made his first international appearance for the American men's team at the 2009 IIHF World Championship. He scored his only goal of the tournament in a 4–3 overtime loss to Switzerland in the qualifying round. After losing their semifinal game to Russia, the United States lost the bronze medal to Sweden by a 4–2 score.

Coaching career
On September 11, 2019, it was announced that Higgins had returned to the Vancouver Canucks organization to serve as an assistant director of player development. On December 23, 2020, the Canucks announced they had reassigned Higgins to serve as the team's Skills and Development Coach.

Playing style
He is known as a two-way player with good skating, capable of contributing offensively while remaining defensively responsible. He has alternated between playing the wing and center positions. Early in his career, he was compared to Dallas Stars forward Brenden Morrow.

Personal life
Higgins grew up in Smithtown, New York, the second eldest among five siblings. His father, Robert, is a New York City firefighter and his younger brother is a New York City police officer.

As a youth, Higgins played in the 1996 Quebec International Pee-Wee Hockey Tournament with the Connecticut Yankees minor ice hockey team, and then in the 1997 tournament with the New York Islanders minor team. As a minor, he played on teams with his future Canadiens teammate Mike Komisarek and his future Flames teammate Eric Nystrom, both of whom he remains close friends with. He was a student of Lithuanian hockey coach Aleksey Nikiforov at hockey camps in his teenage years. Though he grew up on Long Island, Higgins was a Montreal Canadiens fan as a child, following after his father; his favorite players on the team were goaltender Patrick Roy and captain Kirk Muller.

Higgins left home to join the high school hockey program of Avon Old Farms in Connecticut. Following his high school graduation, Higgins was enrolled in Yale University for two years, majoring in political science while playing on the school's hockey team.

Higgins and his ex-partner Chantel have a daughter named Bowen who was born in Vancouver on April 10, 2015.

Career statistics

Regular season and playoffs

International

Notes

Awards and honors

References

External links

1983 births
Living people
American men's ice hockey centers
Calgary Flames players
Florida Panthers players
Hamilton Bulldogs (AHL) players
Ice hockey players from New York (state)
Montreal Canadiens draft picks
Montreal Canadiens players
National Hockey League first-round draft picks
New York Rangers players
Sportspeople from Smithtown, New York
Utica Comets players
Vancouver Canucks players
Yale Bulldogs men's ice hockey players
Avon Old Farms alumni
Yale College alumni
AHCA Division I men's ice hockey All-Americans